Denmark was represented by Anne-Cathrine Herdorf (supported by the group Bandjo), with the song "En lille melodi", at the 1987 Eurovision Song Contest, which took place on 9 April in Brussels. "En lille melodi" was chosen as the Danish entry at the Dansk Melodi Grand Prix on 28 February.

Before Eurovision

Dansk Melodi Grand Prix 1987 
The final was held at the Tivoli in Copenhagen, hosted by Jørgen Mylius. Ten songs took part with the winner being decided by voting from five regional juries in two rounds. Firstly the five lowest-placed songs were eliminated without full voting being revealed, then the remaining five were voted on again to give the winner. Other participants included past and future Danish representatives Dario Campeotto, Tommy Seebach, Birthe Kjær and Kirsten Siggaard of Hot Eyes.

At Eurovision 
On the night of the final Herdorf performed 19th in the running order, following Finland and preceding eventual contest winners Ireland. At the close of voting the song had received 83 points, placing Denmark joint 5th (with the Netherlands) of the 22 entries. The Danish jury awarded its 12 points to Germany.

Voting

References 

1987
Countries in the Eurovision Song Contest 1987
Eurovision